Bugle is a village in mid Cornwall, England, United Kingdom. It is in the parish of Treverbyn and is situated about five miles (8 km) north of St Austell on the A391 road. The 2011 Census for the ward of Bugle which includes Treverbyn and surrounding hamlets gave a population of 4,164.

The village was established in the mid 19th century following the construction of: a turnpike road in 1836–7; the Bugle Inn in 1840; and the Par to Bugle section of the Treffry Tramways in 1842.

The village has a railway station on the Atlantic Coast Line.

Bugle F.C. were South Western League champions in 1984/85. The Bugle Silver Band has been in existence since 1868 and has been successful in many regional competitions.

There are plans to build a new neighbourhood  on the site of the Goonbarrow Refinery west of the village as part of the St Austell and Clay Country Eco-town. This would include 450-550 homes. The plan was given outline approval in July 2009.

References

External links

 Bugle CP School
 Bugle Cricket Club Treverbyn

Villages in Cornwall